Below is a list of notable people who work or have worked in the video game industry.

The list is divided into different roles, but some people fit into more than one category. For example, Sid Meier is both a game designer and programmer. In these cases, the people appear in both sections.

Art and animation
 Dennis Hwang: graphic designer working for Niantic
 Edmund McMillen: artist whose art style is synonymous with Flash games  
 Jordan Mechner: introduced realistic movement to video games with Prince of Persia
 Jim Sachs: created new standard for quality of art with the release of the Amiga game Defender of the Crown
 Derek Yu: Indie video game artist, designer, and blogger. Known for working on Spelunky, Spelunky 2, Aquaria, Eternal Daughter, I'm O.K – A Murder Simulator, and DRL

Company officers
 J Allard: Xbox Officer President
 David Baszucki: founder and CEO of the Roblox Corporation
 Marc Blank: co-founder of Infocom
 Cliff Bleszinski: founder of Boss Key Productions
 Doug Bowser: president of Nintendo of America (2019–present)
 Arjan Brussee: co-founder of Guerrilla Games & Boss Key Productions 
 Jon Burton: founder of Traveller's Tales and its parent company TT Games 
 Nolan Bushnell: founder of Atari
 David Cage: founder of Quantic Dream
 Doug Carlston: co-founder of Brøderbund
 Trevor Chan: founder and CEO of Enlight Software 
 Adrian Chmielarz: founder of Metropolis Software, People Can Fly, and The Astronauts 
 Raphaël Colantonio: founder of Arkane Studios 
 Josef Fares: founder of Hazelight Studios 
 Reggie Fils-Aimé: former president of Nintendo of America (2006–2019)
 Greg Fischbach: CEO of Acclaim Entertainment before it bankrupted
 Jack Friedman: Founder of Jakks Pacific, LJN, and THQ
 Andy Gavin & Jason Rubin: founders of Naughty Dog
 David Gordon: founder of Programma International
 Yves Guillemot: co-founder and CEO of Ubisoft
 Shuntaro Furukawa: President of Nintendo (2018–present)
 Hal Halpin: President of ECA
 John Hanke: founder and CEO of Niantic 
 Cai Haoyu: founder and chairman of miHoYo 
 Trip Hawkins: founder of Electronic Arts
 Akihiro Hino: founder and CEO of Level-5
 Sam Houser: co-founder and President of Rockstar Games
 Atsushi Inaba, Hideki Kamiya, Shinji Mikami, & Tatsuya Minami: founders of PlatinumGames
 Tsunekazu Ishihara: CEO of The Pokémon Company
 Tomonobu Itagaki: Founder of Team Ninja & Valhalla Game Studios
 Satoru Iwata: Former President of Nintendo (2002–2015)
 Jennell Jaquays: started the game design unit at Coleco
 Sampo Karjalainen: Founder of Sulake 
 Tatsumi Kimishima: Former President of Nintendo (2015–2018)
 Michael Kogan: founder of Taito
 Bobby Kotick: CEO of Activision Blizzard
 Kagemasa Kōzuki: founder of Konami
 Ken Kutaragi: Former President of Sony Computer Entertainment, Inc. (1997 - 2007)
 Doug Lowenstein: founder and former President of the Entertainment Software Association
 Hiroshi Matsuyama: CEO of CyberConnect2
 Masafumi Miyamoto: founder of Square 
 Shigeru Miyamoto: Representative Director of Nintendo
 Hidetaka Miyazaki: President of FromSoftware, creator of the Dark Souls series
 Peter Moore: COO at Electronic Arts
 Peter Molyneux: founder of Lionhead Studios, co-founder of Bullfrog Productions
 Michael Morhaime: co-founder and former president of Blizzard Entertainment
 Masaya Nakamura: founder of Namco
 Jay Obernolte: founder of FarSight Studios 
 Philip & Andrew Oliver: co-founders of Blitz Games; twins
 Scott Orr: founder of GameStar, Glu Mobile
 Mark Pincus & Justin Waldron: founders of Zynga
 Randy Pitchford: CEO of Gearbox Software
 Ted Price: President of Insomniac Games
 Paul Reiche III & Fred Ford: founders of Toys for Bob
 John Riccitiello: CEO of Unity Technologies
 Warren Robinett: Founder of The Learning Company
 John Romero: co-founded at least seven game companies: Capitol Ideas Software, Inside Out Software, Ideas from the Deep, id Software, Ion Storm, Monkeystone Games, and Gazillion Entertainment
 Bonnie Ross: Founder and former vice-president of 343 Industries 
 Yoot Saito: founder and CEO of Vivarium Inc.
 Alex Seropian & Jason Jones: Founders of Bungie 
 Jeremiah Slaczka: co-founder of 5th Cell
 Jeff Spangenberg: founder of Retro Studios
 Phil Spencer: head of the Xbox brand
 Tim & Chris Stamper: founders of Ultimate Play the Game & Rare
 Goichi Suda: Founder & CEO of Grasshopper Manufacture 
 Hirokazu Tanaka: President of Creatures
 Kenzo Tsujimoto: founder of Capcom and Irem 
 Feargus Urquhart: CEO of Obsidian Entertainment 
 Christopher Weaver: founder of Bethesda Softworks and co-founder of ZeniMax Media
 Paul Wedgwood: founder and former CEO of Splash Damage
 Jordan Weisman: founder of FASA
 Maximo Cavazzani: founder and CEO of etermax
 David Whatley: founder of Simutronics
 Andrew Wilson: CEO of Electronic Arts (2013–Present) & director of Intel (2017–Present)
 Hiroshi Yamauchi: former president of Nintendo (1949–2002)
 Riccardo Zacconi: founder of King
 Strauss Zelnick: CEO of Take-Two Interactive

Design

Hardware
Ralph Baer: inventor of the Magnavox Odyssey, the first video game console
Seamus Blackley: main designer and developer of the original Xbox
William Higinbotham: main developer of Tennis for Two. One of the first video games developed in the early history of video games. 
Josef Kates: engineer who developed the first digital game-playing machine
Ken Kutaragi: creator of the PlayStation brand
Jerry Lawson: pioneered the video game cartridge by designing the Fairchild Channel F console
Palmer Luckey: founder of Oculus VR (now Reality Labs) and the designer of the Oculus Rift
Ivan Sutherland: Internet pioneer who is regarded as the "father of computer graphics." Also invented the first virtual reality headset with the help of his students
Xiaoyuan Tu & Wei Yen: founders of AiLive, who helped create the motion sensing hardware for the Wii
Gunpei Yokoi: inventor of the Game & Watch, Game Boy and WonderSwan

Music and sound

Online gaming
 Richard Bartle: wrote the first MUD along with Roy Trubshaw
 David Baszucki: creator of Roblox
 John D. Carmack: developed an early online version of Doom which supported up to four players; later Quake supported 16 players which helped popularize online gaming
 Jess Cliffe & Minh Le: developed the first Counter-Strike game and thus started the franchise.
 J. Todd Coleman: Lead creative director of Shadowbane, Wizard101, Pirate101, Crowfall, and many other MMORPG titles.
 Don Daglow: designed first MMORPG with graphics, Neverwinter Nights for AOL
 Alex Evans: created the game engine for the LittleBigPlanet games & Dreams
 Jeff Kaplan: lead designer of Overwatch
 Sampo Karjalainen & Aapo Kyrölä: creators of Habbo Hotel
 John De Margheriti: CEO of BigWorld Pty Ltd, makers of Massively Multiplayer Online Game Middleware (MMOG) technology
 Elonka Dunin: General Manager at Simutronics, senior editor of IGDA Online Games White Papers
 Kelton Flinn: designer of Air Warrior and many other pioneering online games, co-founder of Kesmai
 Richard Garriott (a.k.a. Lord British): Creator of Ultima Online, Work on Lineage, Lineage II (Electronic Arts, NCsoft)
 Dean Hall: Creator of DayZ
 IceFrog: lead designer of Defense of the Ancients and Dota 2
 Raph Koster: LegendMUD, Ultima Online, Star Wars Galaxies. (Electronic Arts, Sony Online Entertainment)
 Brad McQuaid: co-creator of EverQuest (Verant Interactive, Sony Online Entertainment, Sigil Games)
 Rob Pardo: lead designer and producer of World of Warcraft
 Philip Rosedale: founded the virtual world Second Life
 John Smedley: co-creator of EverQuest (Verant Interactive, Sony Online Entertainment) and president of Sony Online Entertainment
 Gordon Walton: executive producer
 Jordan Weisman: founder of 42 Entertainment, co-creator of I Love Bees and The Beast
 Will Wright: c of The Sims Online (Electronic Arts)
Naoki Yoshida: producer of FINAL FANTASY XIV Online: A Realm Reborn and its following expansions.

Producing

 Eiji Aonuma, The Legend of Zelda series
 Mark Cerny, Jak and Daxter series, Spyro the Dragon series and Ratchet & Clank
 Katsuya Eguchi, Animal Crossing series, Star Fox series and Wii series
 Guillaume de Fondaumiere, Fahrenheit (or Indigo Prophecy), Heavy Rain, Beyond: Two Souls and Detroit: Become Human
 Yuji Horii, Dragon Quest series
 Sam Houser, Grand Theft Auto series, Bully, The Warriors, Max Payne 3
 Todd Howard, The Elder Scrolls III: Morrowind, Oblivion, Skyrim, Fallout 3, Fallout 4 and Fallout 76
 Keiji Inafune, Megaman character designer, producer of Dead Rising and Onimusha
 Hideo Kojima, Metal Gear, Zone of the Enders, and Death Stranding
 Ken Levine, BioShock, System Shock 2
 Hisashi Nogami, Animal Crossing series and Splatoon series
 Jade Raymond, Assassin's Creed
 John Romero, executive producer and designer of Heretic, Hexen: Beyond Heretic
 Hironobu Sakaguchi, Final Fantasy series
 Bruce Shelley, Age of Empires
 Rod Fergusson, Gears of War series
 Warren Spector, Thief, Deus Ex
 Daniel Stahl, Star Trek Online, Champions Online
 Yu Suzuki, Virtua Fighter series, Shenmue
 Satoshi Tajiri, Pokémon franchise 
 Dave D. Taylor, Abuse

Programming

 Michael Abrash: pioneer of fast PC graphics; author of graphics programming texts
 Dave Akers: programmer of the arcade games Klax and Escape from the Planet of the Robot Monsters
 Ed Boon: programmer and creator of the Mortal Kombat series 
 Jens Bergensten: lead developer of Minecraft since 2011
 Danielle Bunten Berry: M.U.L.E., Seven Cities of Gold
 Jonathan Blow: creator of Braid and The Witness
 David Braben: co-creator of Elite
 Bill Budge: Raster Blaster and Pinball Construction Set
 John D. Carmack: Wolfenstein 3D, Doom, Quake, co-founded id Software
 Don Daglow: 1970s mainframe games Baseball, Dungeon; also did Intellivision Utopia, first sim game
 Fred Ford: lead programmer of The Horde, Pandemonium!, the Star Control series, and the Skylanders series
 Richard Garriott (a.k.a. Lord British): creator of the Ultima Online series, Tabula Rasa and founder of Origin Systems
 Nasir Gebelli: famous for programming Square Co.'s (Now Square Enix) Final Fantasy for the Famicom (NES) and a few other Square titles; a programming legend on the Apple II
 Mark Healey: known for working on Theme Park, Magic Carpet, Dungeon Keeper, the Fun School games, the LittleBigPlanet games, and Dreams
 Rebecca Heineman: Out of this world and The Bard's Tale
 William Higinbotham: designer and programmer of Tennis for Two, one of the first video games developed during the early history of video games
 Alec Holowka: Indie video game programmer and designer. Known for working on Aquaria, I'm O.K – A Murder Simulator, and Night in the Woods
 Wesley Huntress: Rendezvous: A Space Shuttle Simulator and Wilderness: A Survival Adventure
 André LaMothe: author of several game programming texts
 Maddy Thorson: founder of Extremely OK Games (previously Matt Makes Games) and lead developer of TowerFall and Celeste
 Al Lowe: Leisure Suit Larry series
 Seumas McNally: founder of Longbow Digital Arts and lead programmer of DX-Ball, DX-Ball 2, and Tread Marks. The Seumas McNally Grand Prize is named after him.
 Jordan Mechner: Karateka and Prince of Persia series
 Sid Meier: Civilization series, Railroad Tycoon, co-founder of Firaxis Games
 Alan Miller: original programmer for Atari 2600, co-founded publishers Activision and Accolade
 Jeff Minter: founder of Llamasoft and programmer of most of their games
 David Mullich: The Prisoner and other Edu-Ware games
 Yuji Naka: Sonic the Hedgehog and other Sega games
 Gabe Newell: Half-Life; co-founder of Valve
 Markus Persson (a.k.a. Notch): created Minecraft; founder of Mojang
 Steve Polge: Unreal series and other Epic Games games
 Zoë Quinn: programmer and video game blogger. Known for developing Depression Quest and for her role in the Gamergate controversy 
 Frédérick Raynal: best known for Alone in the Dark and the Little Big Adventure series
 Chris Roberts: programmer and designer of Freelancer, Star Citizen, and the Wing Commander games. 
 Warren Robinett: Adventure, Rocky's Boots, & Robot Odyssey
 John Romero: game programmer since 1979; known for Commander Keen, Doom, Quake
 Jim Sachs: programmer of Saucer Attack and other home computer era games
 Chris Sawyer: programmer and designer RollerCoaster Tycoon series and other games
 Cher Scarlett: programmer who worked at Blizzard Entertainment and known for her role in California Department of Fair Employment and Housing v. Activision Blizzard
 Tim Schafer: programmer and designer of Full Throttle, Grim Fandango, Psychonauts, Brütal Legend, and Broken Age. Also worked on the Monkey Island games.
 Ken Silverman: author of the Build engine game engine
 Tim Sweeney: founded Epic Games, Unreal series and the Unreal Engine
 Anne Westfall: programmer of the Archon series of games
 Will Wright: programmer of first games in SimCity series and co-founder of Maxis
 Brianna Wu: programmer known for working on Revolution 60 and for her role in the Gamergate controversy 
 Corrinne Yu: Halo lead and principal engine architect (Microsoft Halo team), Gearbox Software (studio wide) Director of Platform Technology, Ion Storm (studio wide) Director of Technology, Prey engine lead programmer at 3D Realms

References

Video game development
Video game industry
+People